The 2022–23 Future FC season is the club's 12th season in existence and the second consecutive season in the top flight of Egyptian football. In addition to the domestic league, Future are participating in this season's editions of the Egypt Cup, the EFA Cup and the CAF Confederation Cup.

Players

First-team squad

(captain)

Transfers

In

Out

Pre-season and friendlies

Competitions

Overview

Egyptian Premier League

League table

Results summary

Results by round

Matches 
The league fixtures were announced on 9 October 2022.

Egypt Cup

EFA Cup

CAF Confederation Cup

Qualifying rounds 

The draw for the qualifying rounds was held on 9 August 2022.

First round

Second round

Play-off round

Group stage 

The draw for the group stage was held on 12 December 2022.

References

Future FC
Future